Dunmurry is an urban townland in Belfast, Northern Ireland. Dunmurry is in the Collin electoral ward for the local government district of Belfast City Council.

History
Until the end of the 18th century, Dunmurry was largely an agricultural area dominated by wealthy landowners.
In 1817, work began on a new road from Belfast to Dublin through Finaghy and Dunmurry. This replaced the old turnpike road through Upper Malone and Drumbeg to Lambeg, which was linked to the town by Dunmurry Lane.

Throughout the 19th century, Dunmurry became known as one of the many 'linen villages' that were spread across Ulster as many of the local factories and mills were promoted by local entrepreneurs. It remained very much a village until the late 1920s, when developers became keen to seize the greenfield sites for overspill housing and for industry - a phenomenon which became particularly evident after World War II. The largest expansion of the village in this era came with the advent of the Housing Trust, who, in response to a 1951 order for 1500 units of social housing to be built between Belfast and Lisburn, purchased a large amount of land at Suffolk and former demesne land at Seymour Hill and Conway. One third of these housing units were reserved for residents of Lisburn

Politics
Politically, Dunmurry falls into the Collin district electoral area of Belfast City Council. This is composed of the wards of Dunmurry, Seymour Hill, Derriaghy, Colin Glen, Kilwee, Poleglass, Twinbrook and Lagmore.

From 1 April 2015, Dunmurry transferred to Belfast City Council under local government reforms.

In 2008, it was recorded in statute that the Dunmurry ward would transfer in its entirety from Lagan Valley to Belfast West. Furthermore, it was decided that the section of the Derriaghy wards which lay to the north of the Derriaghy and Lagmore townland boundary would also transfer to Belfast West.

The Member of Parliament for the constituency in which most of Dunmurry lies is Paul Maskey, Sinn Féin MP for Belfast West.

Features
Backed by the Colin Mountain, with its Colin Glen, Dunmurry is flanked by the River Lagan which, although canalised, still retains the atmosphere of a quiet rural waterway. All around Dunmurry's housing estates are open landscapes which include the golf course, the Antrim Hills, Moss Side and the Lagan Valley. There are also extensive playing fields in and around Dunmurry.

Dunmurry has its own golf club, originally located in Upper Dunmurry Lane. The course was designed and laid by G.S. Dunn of Newcastle, County Down, in 1805. The course was extended to 14 holes in 1973 and then to 18 holes in 1977. After road improvements were carried out in the area, the club moved to a new course in Dunmurry Lane, approximately 1 mile away from the previous course. The original course is now a 9-hole course and is home to the Colin Valley Golf Club.

Dunmurry is also the home of Dunmurry Cricket Club who play in the Northern Cricket Union. Dunmurry C.C was formed in the 1940s and has had varied success in the N.C.U. Its most important achievement was the winning of three Junior Cups which is represented in the club badge by three stars and the arch in the badge represents one of the many bridges in Dunmurry.

Dunmurry Primary School has served the local community since opening its doors in 1930. It was inspected by the Education and Training Inspectorate in November 2011 and was rated 'outstanding' - the highest rating attainable. The school also has a Nursery Unit which opened its doors in September 2004. More recent additions to the school include an environmental garden, raised bed planting area and wildlife pond. It also provides a breakfast club from 8 am and after school care.

Dunmurry was home to Dunmurry High School (established in 1968 to teach the children's age range - 11 to 16) which closed in 2011, Rathmore Grammar School (consisting of over 1000 pupils and has topped the league tables several times for Best A Level Results), and the Belfast Bible College, one of five Queen's University constituent colleges recognised to teach undergraduate and postgraduate (certificate, diploma and part-time) courses in Theology. The Belfast Bible College does not belong to any single denomination but is a community drawn from 20 different denominations and over 30 different countries. There are currently about 120 full-time students, one third of whom are following degree pathways.

Dunmurry was the location of the DeLorean Motor Company factory where the DeLorean sports car was manufactured from 1981 until 1982. About 8,500 DeLoreans were made before production ended in 1982, and as of 2006, 6,500 are estimated to still exist. The DeLorean was famously featured in the Back to the Future movie trilogy.

Dunmurry tower block fire

A fire broke out in the fourteen-storey Coolmoyne House on the Seymour Hill estate that is operated by the Northern Ireland Housing Executive in Dunmurry at around 17:30 on 15 November 2017. The 56-flat tower block and its sister block Rathmoyne House were built in 1964 by Lisburn City Council. There were no fatal injuries and four minor injuries. The fire broke out on a flat on the ninth floor and the occupant alerted his neighbours. There was great concern as the automatic fire alarms failed to activate and residents had to be individually alerted. The ambulance and fire service were present by 17:35 and the residents were evacuated to the Seymour Hill and Conway Community residents' association community hall. It was explained that the alarms had worked to specification and would only sound when smoke was detected in each individual flat. This failed to placate the residents as the incident was exactly five months after the Grenfell Tower fire.

Sport
Dunmurry Cricket Club plays in the NCU Senior League.
Dunmurry Recreation F.C., more commonly known as Dunmurry Rec.
Dunmurry Young Men F.C.
Iveagh United F.C.
Dunmurry Golf Club
Eire Og Derriaghy

Transport

Dunmurry railway station, located on the main Belfast–Dublin railway line, opened on 12 August 1839. The local train service offers transport to Belfast, Lisburn, Portadown, Newry and Bangor. 
Dunmurry village is also regularly serviced by the Metro services:
9A to Conway via Lisburn Road & Finaghy Conway (River Road) and
9C to Conway via Lisburn Road, Balmoral & Finaghy, departing from Donegall Square East, in Central Belfast.
Dunmurry Village is also serviced by Translink Ulsterbus Services to Lisburn, Crumlin, Antrim, Craigavon, Portadown, Newry and Armagh. 

The M1 motorway passes through Dunmurry, at Junction 3 (Black's Road) providing a fast route to and from central Belfast.

Notable people
Bobby Sands, Irish Revolutionary, Hunger Striker and Fermanagh/South Tyrone MP 
Barry Hobson (1925–2017), cricketer and educator
Catherine McGuinness, Judge of the Irish Supreme Court
Allan McClelland (1917-2005), character actor (West 11)

References

External links

 Dunmurry's Past
 Dunmurry Changing

Townlands of County Antrim
Wards of Northern Ireland
Civil parish of Drumbeg